The Roman Catholic Archdiocese of Hankou is a Latin Rite Metropolitan archdiocese, based in Hankou, Wuhan, Hubei, China.

Its archiepiscopal see is the Cathedral of St. Joseph, in Hankou, Wuhan.

It is since 1961, due to the political situation, a vacant 'underground' (arch)diocese, without apostolic administrator.

History 
 Established in 1696 as Apostolic Vicariate of Hupeh and Hunan 湖廣 / Houkouang, on territory split off from the Apostolic Vicariate of Fujian
 Renamed on 8 April 1856 as Apostolic Vicariate of Hupeh 湖北 / Hu-pé, having lost territory to establish Apostolic Vicariate of Hunan 湖南)
 Lost territory on 1870.09.02 to establish Apostolic Vicariate of Southwestern Hupeh 湖北南境
 Renamed on September 11, 1870 as Apostolic Vicariate of Eastern Hupeh, having lost territory to establish Apostolic Vicariate of Northwestern Hupeh 湖北西北)
 Renamed on December 12, 1923 after its see as Apostolic Vicariate of Hankou
 Lost territories again : on 1929.07.18 to establish Mission sui juris of Huangzhou 黃州 and on 1937.06.17 to establish Apostolic Prefecture of Suixian 隨縣
 Promoted on 1946.04.11 as Metropolitan Archdiocese of Hankou

Ecclesiastical province 
Its Suffragan sees are :
 Roman Catholic Diocese of Hanyang 漢陽
 Roman Catholic Diocese of Laohekou 
 Puqi 蒲圻
 Roman Catholic Diocese of Qizhou  蘄州
 Roman Catholic Diocese of Shinan 施南
 Roman Catholic Diocese of Wuchang 武昌
 Roman Catholic Diocese of Xiangyang 襄陽
 Roman Catholic Diocese of Yichang 宜昌

Episcopal ordinaries 
(all Roman Rite)

Apostolic Vicars of Hupeh and Hunan 湖廣
 Giovanni Francesco Nicolai(s) (余宜閣), Friars Minor (O.F.M.) (born Italy) (1696.10.20 – death 1737.12.27), Titular Archbishop of Myra (1712.08.20 – 1737.12.27), previously Bishop of Nanjing 南京 (China) (1691 – 1696.10.20), Titular Bishop of Berytus (1696.10.20 – 1712.08.20)
 Giacomo Luigi Fontana (馮), Paris Foreign Missions Society (M.E.P.) (born Italy) (1838 – death 1838.07.11), Titular Bishop of Sinita (1817.05.24 – 1838.07.11); previously Apostolic Vicar of Szechwan 四川 (China) (1817.05.24 – 1838)
 Giovanni Domenico Rizzolati, O.F.M. (born Italy) (1839.08.30 – retired 1856.04.08), Titular Bishop of Arad (1839.08.30 – death 1862.04.13)

Apostolic Vicars of Hupeh 湖北東境 
 Luigi Celestino Spelta, Reformed Friars Minor (O.F.M. Ref.) (born Italy) (1856.04.08 – 1862.09.02), Titular Bishop of Thespia (1848.09.17 – death 1862.09.02); next Coadjutor Apostolic Vicar of Kiangnan 江南 (China) (1848.09.17 – 1856.04.08)
 Eustachio Vito Modesto Zanoli, O.F.M. (born Italy) (1862.09.01 – 1870.09.11 see below), Titular Bishop of Eleutheropolis (1857.08.06 – 1883.05.17); succeeding as previous Coadjutor Vicar Apostolic of Hupeh 湖北 (1857.08.06 – 1862.09.01), earlier Titular Bishop of Magyddus (1856.12.04 – 1857.08.06 not possessed)

Apostolic Vicars of Eastern Hupeh 湖北東境 
 Eustachio Vito Modesto Zanoli (明位篤), O.F.M. (see above 1870.09.11 – death 1883.05.17)
 Epiphane Carlassare, O.F.M. (born Italy) (18 June 1884 – death 24 July 1909), Titular Bishop of Madauros (1884.06.18 – 1909.07.24)

Apostolic Vicars of Hankou 漢口 
 Graziano Génnaro, O.F.M. (24 July 1909 – death 1923.12.19), Titular Bishop of Hiericho (1906.08.25 – 1923.12.19), succeeding as previous Coadjutor Vicar Apostolic of Eastern Hupeh 湖北東境 (1906.08.25 – 1909.07.24)
Apostolic Administrator Eugenio Massi, O.F.M. (希賢) (born Italy) (1925 – succession 26 January 1927), Titular Bishop of Joppe (1910.02.15 – death 10 December 1944); previously Apostolic Vicar of Northern Shansi 山西北境 (China) (1910.02.15 – 1916.07.07), Apostolic Vicar of Central Shensi 陝西中境 (China) (1916.07.07 – 1924.12.03), Apostolic Vicar of Xi’anfu 西安府 (China) (1924.12.03 – 1927.01.26)
 Eugenio Massi, O.F.M. (希賢) (26 January 1927 – death 10 December 1944)Metropolitan Archbishops of Hankou 漢口 
 Giuseppe Ferruccio Maurizio Rosà, O.F.M. (born Italy) (1946.07.26 – death 1961.08.08)uncanonical Bernardine Dong Guang-qing (董光清), O.F.M. (first native Chinese incumbent) (1958 – 1994 see below), first term without papal mandate
 Victor Liu He-de (1984 - death 10 December 2001)
 Giuseppe Ferruccio Maurizio Rosà, O.F.M. (see above 26 July 1946 – death 8 August 1961), canonical second term with papal mandate
 long vacancy
 Francis Cui Qingqi, ordained 8 September 2020

See also 
 List of Catholic dioceses in China

References

Sources and external links 
 GCatholic.org - data for all sections
 Catholic Hierarchy

Roman Catholic dioceses in China
Roman Catholic dioceses and prelatures established in the 17th century
Religion in Hubei
Organizations based in Wuhan
Religious organizations established in 1696
1696 establishments in Asia